Gu Hongming in his time known as Ku Hung-ming (Wade-Giles: Ku Hung-ming; Pinyin: Gū Hóngmíng; Pe̍h-ōe-jī: Ko͘ Hông-bêng; courtesy name: Hongming; ordinary name: 湯生 in Chinese or Tomson in English) (18 July 185730 April 1928) was a British Malaya born Chinese man of letters. He also used the pen name "Amoy Ku".

Life
Gu Hongming was born in Penang, British Malaya (present day Malaysia), the second son of a Chinese rubber plantation superintendent, whose ancestral hometown was Tong'an, Fujian province, China, and his Portuguese wife. The British plantation owner was fond of Gu and took him, at age ten, to Scotland for his education. He was then known as Koh Hong Beng (the Min Nan pronunciation of his name). In 1873 he began studying Literature at the University of Edinburgh, graduating in the spring of 1877 with an M.A. He then earned a diploma in Civil Engineering at the University of Leipzig, and studied law in Paris.

He returned to Penang in 1880, and soon joined the colonial Singapore civil service, where he worked until 1883. He went to China in 1885, and served as an advisor to the ranking official Zhang Zhidong for twenty years.

Leo Tolstoy, whom he had befriended, and Gu were both opposed to the Hundred Days' Reform, which was led by prominent reformist intellectuals of the time, including Kang Youwei.

From 1905 to 1908, he was the director of the Huangpu River Authority (上海浚治黃浦江河道局) in Shanghai. He served in the Imperial Foreign Ministry from 1908 to 1910, then as the president of the Nanyang Public School, the forerunner of Shanghai Jiao Tong University. He resigned the latter post in 1911 as a sign of his loyalty to the fallen imperial Qing government. In 1915, he became a professor at Peking University. Beginning in 1924 he lived in Japan and Japanese-administered Taiwan for three years as a guest lecturer in Oriental cultures. Then he returned to live in Beijing until his death on 30 April 1928 at the age of 72.

An advocate of monarchy and Confucian values, preserving his queue even after the overthrow of the Qing dynasty, Gu became a kind of cultural curiosity late in his life. In 1934, writer Wen Yuan-ning wrote: "That ostentatious display of his queue is very symptomatic of the whole man. He is cross-grained: he lives by opposition." Many sayings and anecdotes have been attributed to him, few of which can be attested. Literary figures as diverse as Ryūnosuke Akutagawa, Somerset Maugham and Rabindranath Tagore were all drawn to visit him when they were in China. No scholarly edition of his complete works is available.

He was fluent in English, Chinese, German, Russian and French, and understood Italian, Ancient Greek, Latin, Japanese and Malay. He acquired Chinese only after his studies in Europe, and was said to have bad Chinese hand-writing. However, his command of the language was far above average. He penned several Chinese books, including a vivid memoir recollecting his days as an assistant for Zhang Zhidong.

His character appeared in the drama "Towards the Republic".

Works
His English works include: 
 Papers from a Viceroy's Yamen: a Chinese Plea for the Cause of Good Government and True Civilization (1901)
 ET nunc, reges, intelligite! The Moral Cause of the Russia-Japanese War (1906)
 The Universal Order or The Conduct of Life (1906)
 The Story of a Chinese Oxford Movement (1910)
 The Spirit of the Chinese People (1915)

He translated some of the Confucian classics into English:

 The Discourses and Sayings of Confucius (1898)
 The Universal Order or Conduct of Life (1912)
 Higher Education (1915)

He rendered William Cowper's narrative poem The Diverting History of John Gilpin into classical Chinese verse (known as 癡漢騎馬歌).

References

Further reading 

 . TOC and Free excerpt
 Huang Xingtao 黃兴涛 (1995). Wenhua guaijie Gu Hongming (文化怪杰辜鸿铭 "Gu Hongming: a cultural eccentric"). Beijing: Zhonghua Book Company.
 Kong Qingmao 孔慶茂 (1996). Gu Hongming pingzhuan (辜鴻銘評傳 "A biography of Gu Hongming"). Nanchang: Baihuazhou wenyi chubanshe.

External links

  Biography and related articles
 http://heavyangloorthodox.blogspot.com/2017/04/gu-hongmings-commentary-on-confucian-way.html
 https://cpciti.wordpress.com/2015/05/06/gu-hongming/ 
 WorldCat Ku, Hung-ming
 Internet Archive, "Gu Hongming." Free internet copies of his works.

 

Chinese monarchists
Conservatism in China
Republic of China essayists
English-language writers from Malaysia
Chinese–English translators
Malaysian people of Hokkien descent
Malaysian people of Chinese descent
Singaporean people of Hokkien descent
Malaysian people of Kristang descent
Malaysian people of Portuguese descent
Malaysian writers
Alumni of the University of Edinburgh
1857 births
1928 deaths
Chinese people of Portuguese descent
Academic staff of Peking University
Qing dynasty essayists
Republic of China translators
Qing dynasty translators
Malaysian educators